Mykolayiv National Agrarian University (also known as MNAU, Ukrainian: Миколаївський національний аграрний університет (МНАУ)) is a public agricultural college in Mykolaiv, Ukraine.

Organization 
Mykolayiv National Agrarian University is the leading institution of higher education in the south of Ukraine.

According to the rating of the agrarian institutions of higher education (III-IV levels of accreditation) the university is the second and it won the honorary title of "The Leader in Modern Science and Education".

Main fields of activities:
Agrarian and economic education, strengthening the links between Academia and Industry; also our current priority is all aspects of investment processes as well as innovative techniques in agriculture.

References

External links 
   
 President congratulates students and professors of Mykolaiv State Agricultural University on assignment of national status to this institution

Buildings and structures in Mykolaiv
Educational institutions established in 2002
2002 establishments in Ukraine
National universities in Ukraine